Shiva Keshavan,  (born 25 August 1981) is a six-time Olympian and the first Indian representative to compete in luge at the Winter Olympic Games.

Career
Keshavan skied as a child and won the Junior National Ski Championship in 1995 at the age of 14. At the age of 15, he attended a luge camp at his school conducted by world champion Günther Lemmerer. Keshavan was selected as a promising young athlete and went on to become the youngest person to ever officially qualify for the Olympic Games in luge, attending the 1998 Nagano games at the age of 16.

In 2014, Keshavan walked as an Independent Olympic Participant at the Winter Olympics opening ceremony in Sochi due to the suspension of the Indian Olympic Association. However, later on during the Sochi Winter Olympics, Indian Olympic Association made a comeback as a recognized country by the International Olympic Committee resulting in Keshavan competing under the Indian flag.

Beginning in November 2014, Keshavan collaborated with Duncan Kennedy to train for 2018 PyeongChang Winter Olympics. Duncan acted as Keshavan’s personal coach while leveraging his technical expertise to improve Keshavan’s sled.

Keshavan qualified for his sixth and final Olympics in 2018, where he finished 34th out of 40 athletes in the  men's singles event.

In 2014 Shiva Keshavan became the founder-president of the Olympians Association of India and is committed to support the Olympic movement in India.
 
Shiva now aims at promoting Winter Games in India, and creating an ecosystem to produce more athletes competing at the highest level.

Training
In 2002, the Italian luge team offered Keshavan full use of their coaches and training facilities if he competed under the Italian flag, but he did not take the offer, insisting he wanted to continue representing India. "For me the dream was to get the Olympics to my hometown, and that was the only reason I was doing it. To show that we are also here."

Keshavan often speaks in interviews about his struggles to finance his career. Early in his career, he would borrow sleds for his races. After landing in Montreal for the 2002 games, he hitchhiked to Salt Lake City. In 2006, he did not compete for two seasons due to running out of funds. Keshavan gets most of his money from crowdfunding on the Internet and in the 2014 Sochi games, his uniform bore the names of 50,000 donors.

Personal life
Keshavan is the son of an Indian father from Kerala and an Italian mother, who met while backpacking in the Himalayas in the 1970s. His parents run an Italian restaurant in Himachal Pradesh. He was born and brought up in Manali, Himachal Pradesh and attended The Lawrence School, Sanawar. He married Namita Agarwal, a former classmate at school, who is also his sports manager. The couple have a daughter. He studied humanities and political science at the University of Florence and received a Master's degree in International relations from the University of Florence.

Keshavan spends time promoting the cause of winter sports in India; a grassroots level luge camp was held in India by Keshavan in 2009 for young athletes interested in trying the sport. Ten were selected to form the Junior National Luge team to train in Japan. Since then, around 200 Indian children have attended his training camps, and after retiring from competition Keshavan plans to focus on recruiting new Indian winter athletes.

Awards and achievements

 Arjuna Award, Government of India - 2020 - First Winter Sport athlete to win the award
 NDTV Outstanding performer of the year award- winner, 2012
 Asian Luge cup – Gold Medal, 2011 & 2012
 Asian Luge cup – Silver Medal, 2009
 Asian Luge cup – Bronze Medal, 2005 & 2008
 Youngest luge Olympian in history - 1998 Winter Olympics
 First Indian luger to qualify for the Winter Olympic Games

President of Olympians Association of India
Member of Athletes' Commission and Ethics Committee with Indian Olympic Association 
Member of State Sports Council,  Himachal Pradesh 
Past WADA Ambassador

2018 Pyeongchang Winter Olympics results

Popular culture
Keshavan gained some fame after a training session during which he fell off his sled and yet managed to climb back on and complete the run; the video of the training run was shared widely on the internet.

References

External links
 

1981 births
Indian male lugers
Indian people of Italian descent
Living people
Lugers at the 1998 Winter Olympics
Lugers at the 2002 Winter Olympics
Lugers at the 2006 Winter Olympics
Lugers at the 2010 Winter Olympics
Lugers at the 2014 Winter Olympics
Olympic lugers of India
Lawrence School, Sanawar alumni
Lugers at the 2018 Winter Olympics
Sportspeople from Himachal Pradesh
People from Manali, Himachal Pradesh
Recipients of the Arjuna Award